Roodhouse Township is one of thirteen townships in Greene County, Illinois, USA.  As of the 2010 census, its population was 2,241 and it contained 1,109 housing units.

Geography

Cities, towns, villages
 Roodhouse

Unincorporated towns
 Barrow at 
(This list is based on USGS data and may include former settlements.)

Cemeteries
The township contains these six cemeteries: Ferwood, Martins Prairie, Thompson, Tunnison, Williams-Edwards and Williams-Edwards.

Major highways
  Illinois Route 106
  Illinois Route 267

Landmarks
 American Legion Park

Demographics

School districts
 North Greene Unit School District 3
 Winchester Community Unit School District 1

Political districts
 Illinois's 17th congressional district
 State House District 97
 State Senate District 49

References
 
 United States Census Bureau 2007 TIGER/Line Shapefiles
 United States National Atlas

External links
 City-Data.com
 Illinois State Archives

Townships in Greene County, Illinois
Townships in Illinois

es:Roodhouse (Illinois)